Tacalcitol (1,24-dihydroxyvitamin D3) is a synthetic vitamin D3 analog.  Tacalcitol is marketed under several names, including Curatoderm and Bonalfa.

It is on the World Health Organization's List of Essential Medicines.

Mechanism
Tacalcitol reduces excessive cell turnover in the epidermis by interacting with vitamin D receptors on keratinocytes.

Uses
It is usually prescribed by a general practitioner or dermatologist for the treatment of psoriasis, chronic chapped lips and other severe dry skin conditions because of its ability to reduce excessive skin cell turnover. It is available as an ointment or lotion.

It has also been used for vitiligo and Hailey-Hailey disease.

References 

Secosteroids
Vitamin D